Harold Vincent Drew (12 October 1902 – 2 December 1970) was an Accountant, Australian politician, Company Director and the Chief President of the Australian Natives' Association.

Early Years

Harry Drew was born in South Melbourne to dairyman Edward Harvey Drew and Charlotte Helen Farnell. He attended University High School and became an accountant, working for E. H. Shackell and Co., General Motors-Holden from 1927 to 1931 and Vocalion (A'asia) Ltd 1931-1933. He was also made a director of Vocalion in 1931.

Australian Natives' Association

Drew was a member of Middle Park A.N.A. Branch No.224.  He was elected to the A.N.A. Board in 1930.  He was elected Chief President at Mildura Annual Conference in 1934.  He presided over Queenscliff Annual Conference in 1935. He was also Chairman of the Metropolitan Committee in 1929-1930

Drew was a skilled debater.  He had a fluent ready wit and gave attention to detail.  The Western Australian Secessionist movement was current during his Chief Presidency and he proposed that their grievances should be addressed though constitutional means, not secession.  National health insurance and the development of Northern Australia were significant national issues to which he publicly referred.

Politics

In 1932, he was elected to the Victorian Legislative Assembly as the United Australia Party member for Albert Park where he severed for five year. He lost endorsement in 1937 and was defeated as an independent candidate.

After return from the armed services in 1947 he was elected to the Victorian Legislative Assembly for the Mentone as the Liberal Party Member, he was defeated in 1950.

WW2
During World War II he joined the Royal Australian Air Force in 1939 and served as a squadron leader until 1947. He served in Victoria and New South Wales during the war.

Family

On 18 October 1940 he married Shirley Doreen Brand, with whom he had two children.

Later Years
He returned to work part-time as an accountant, but increasingly suffered from ill health. Drew died in Melbourne in 1970.

References

1902 births
1970 deaths
United Australia Party members of the Parliament of Victoria
Independent members of the Parliament of Victoria
Liberal Party of Australia members of the Parliament of Victoria
Members of the Victorian Legislative Assembly
20th-century Australian politicians
Royal Australian Air Force personnel of World War II
Royal Australian Air Force officers